Shahrdansh (also Romanized as Shahrdānsh) is a village in Tus Rural District, in the Central District of Mashhad County, Razavi Khorasan Province, Iran. At the 2006 census, its population was 14,839, in 3,745 families.

References 

Populated places in Mashhad County